Wanzi Station is a station on Line 7 of the Beijing Subway.

First & Last Time
Beijing West Railway Station — Hua Zhuang
The first train 5:32
The last train 23:17
Hua Zhuang — Beijing West Railway Station
The first train 5:52
The last train 23:36

Station Layout 
The station has 2 underground side platforms.

Exits 
There are 3 exits, lettered A, C, and D. Exits A and C are accessible.

References

Railway stations in China opened in 2014
Beijing Subway stations in Xicheng District